Woodford Wells Football Club was an English association football club from Woodford Wells in Essex.  The home pitch was in Monkhams Lane (at the rear of the Travellers Rest) which is now The Woodford Wells Club.

History
The club was founded in 1869 and its first match, against Forest School was played to a modified rugby code.  The match was 15 per side (at the time association laws did not specify the size of teams) and included three Kaye brothers, three Spicer brothers, and two Powell brothers.  The return fixture the next month was to association laws, although the club only had 10 players.

The 1872 A.G.M was held at the Travellers Rest Inn (now The Travellers Friend) at which the following officiated:

 President: J Spicer
 Hon. Sec.: A.H.Tozer
 Captain:  H.E.Kaye
 Vice-Capt.: A.E.Hooper

The club's first entry into the FA Cup was in 1873-74.  In the first round, the club beat Reigate Priory by 3-1 or 3-2; the Priory claimed a goal in the last minute and the sole umpire, Mr Bouch from Crystal Palace, gave it as "undecided".  In the second round, the club lost 2-1 to the Swifts after playing into the wind for most of the game.

The following year saw the club's best FA Cup run, beating High Wycombe and Southall to reach the quarter-finals, losing to Shropshire Wanderers in a replay.

The club's final FA Cup appearance was in the 1875-76 tournament, losing to Panthers F.C. in the first round at the neutral ground of Winchester College.  Woodford Wells' final match that season was a 3-0 defeat to the Royal Engineers and the club seems to have wound up before the next season started as there are no further recorded fixtures for the club, with three of its regular players turning out for Upton Park instead.

Colours

The club's kit was black jersey, stockings and cap (with white Maltese cross on jersey and cap).

Records
Best FA Cup performance: Quarter-final – 1874-75
Biggest win: 6-0 v Trojans, 11 February 1871

Former players
 G.F. Thomson

References

Defunct football clubs in England
Defunct football clubs in London